Inquilaab is a 1984 Hindi-language political action thriller film, starring Amitabh Bachchan and Sridevi in lead roles, with Utpal Dutt, Kader Khan, Ranjeet, Shakti Kapoor and others in supporting roles. Nirupa Roy also appears as the mother of Amitabh Bachchan's character in one scene. The movie was produced by N. Veeraswamy and V. Ravichandran, and the music was composed by Laxmikant-Pyarelal. It is a remake of 1983 Kannada film Chakravyuha (1983), which was also produced by V. Ravichandran.

Plot 
Amarnath aka Amar is an educated-young man, who has not received any qualified job as all positions force him to compromise his morals. A new politician, Shankar Narayan promises an end to corruption, but gets disrespected by the crowd, who pelts stones at him. Amar rescues him where Shankar is impressed and trains Amar to be a cop. Amar completes his IPS exam where he is posted as an ACP and serves the state honestly. Amar meets Asha, who is the only daughter of multi-millionaire businessman, Seetharam. The two fall for each other where their relationship is accepted by Seetharam, after Shankar's insistence.

Amar discovers a crime network that includes Shankar as well as Seetharam and is made as a pawn in syndicate's crimes. Amar is blackmailed into collaborating with them as they show him a pic where Amar had giving the briefcase to Seetharam's partner, where he reveals that the partner is actually an international smuggler named Koya-Koya Hatachi aka Richard Louis. Amar was ordered by Seetharam to retrieve diamonds from Richard Louis and also save him from police. Amar does his job, but kills him and gets immensely popular with the public. Inspector Pratap, who is Amar's colleague issues a warrant to search Amar's house by the orders from the commissioner.

Prathap knows that Amar has retrieved the diamonds from Richard Louis, but he is unable to find the diamonds because Amar hid them inside his fake bandages. Asha misunderstands Amar and leaves him, along with their new-born child. Heartbroken at the separation, Amar resigns from the police force. Amar files for a nomination in the elections at Shankar's insistence and becomes the CM with the network's support as they form the government with their syndicate members. In their cabinet meeting, Amar smuggles out a machine gun and reveals his intentions to massacre everyone for the country's welfare, Amar kills all of them, including Seetharam and Shankar. Asha learns about Seetharam's misdeeds and the blackmail where Asha reconciles with Amar. Amar surrenders to the police for his crimes and is arrested where the crowd walks back to the police vehicle, who demands that Amar should be released.

Cast

Amitabh Bachchan as Amarnath
Sridevi as Asha
Utpal Dutt as Seetaram
Kader Khan as Shankar Narayan
Shakti Kapoor as Koya Koya Atachi
Ranjeet as Bhupati / B. Pathi
Nirupa Roy as Amarnath's Mother
Purnima as Amarnath's Aunty
Iftekhar as Police Commissioner
Shafi Inamdar as Inspector Pratap
Jagdish Raj as IG Shamsher Singh
T. P. Jain as Victor Jairaj
C. S. Dubey as Saraswati Prasad
Pinchoo Kapoor as Vishwanath
Ram Mohan as Kamleshswar Rao
Viju Khote as Bhupati's Associate 
Tiger Prabhakar as Anil Raj

Reception 
Despite completing a silver jubilee, the film was considered to only be an average hit.

Soundtrack
The music was composed by Laxmikant-Pyarelal, while the lyrics were by Anand Bakshi. The film contains 5 songs, all sung by Kishore Kumar (including 2 duets with Asha Bhosle).

References

External links

1980s Hindi-language films
1984 films
Films directed by T. Rama Rao
Films scored by Laxmikant–Pyarelal
Hindi remakes of Kannada films
Indian pregnancy films
Films about corruption in India
Indian action films
1980s police procedural films
1984 action films